Kiron Kumar Gogoi was an Indian teacher and politician belonging to Asom Gana Parishad. He was elected as a member of Assam Legislative Assembly from Moran in 1985.

Before coming to politics Gogoi served as Hindi teacher of Lezai Higher Secondary School. He was the President of the Dibrugarh District Assam Sahitya Sabha and till his death he was a Central Committee member of Assam Sahitya Sabha. He also served as the Chairman of Assam Petrochemicals Limited.
 
Gogoi died on 8 June 2019 at the age of 64.

References

1950s births
2019 deaths
Asom Gana Parishad politicians
Assam MLAs 1985–1991
Indian schoolteachers